The Bombay cat  is a type of short-haired cat developed by breeding sable Burmese and black American Shorthair cats, to produce a cat of mostly Burmese type, but with a sleek, panther-like black coat. Bombay is the name given to black cats of the Asian group.

History
The breed was developed by Nikki Horner, a breeder from Louisville, Kentucky, who, starting in 1958, attempted to create a breed of cat that resembled a miniature black panther. The first attempt was a failure, but the second, in 1965, was successful. The breed was officially recognized and registered by the Cat Fanciers' Association in 1970 and The International Cat Association in 1979.

Appearance 

The Bombay is a short-haired breed of domestic cat, closely related to the Burmese. Bombay cats are typically characterized as having an all-black coat, black soles, black nose and mouth, with copper or green eyes. The close-lying, sleek and glossy black coat is generally colored to the roots, with little or no paling. 

The Bombay has a medium body build that is muscular. Their weight is usually  or more with males typically being heavier than females.

Breed standard 
Body: Medium size, graceful and elongated body. Long, elegant tail.

Head: Rounded, short. The shape is smooth. Some cats nose is slightly flattened so called modern type. Some have a normal nose - the so-called traditional type. The ears are straight, rounded at the tips. Eyes only amber in color.

Wool: Short, dense and shiny, tight to the body, with a lacquered sheen

Health 
A healthy Bombay can live around 15 to 20 years.  They can have some sinus problems, snuffly noses, and gingivitis. Their food intake should be controlled to avoid overfeeding.

Temperament 

The personality of the Bombay tends to be highly social, is marked by strong attachment to families, and is typified by a craving for attention. As a breed, they are therefore highly suitable for children.

Bombay cats are happy and comfortable being strictly indoor cats. They are also great apartment cats and can comfortably be in one room, as long as all their needs are met (food, water, litter, safe and warm place to sleep, access to toys and their human).

References

External links

Cat breeds
Cat breeds originating in the United States